Pine snake may refer to:

 Pituophis melanoleucus, a nonvenomous colubrid found in North America
 Lampropeltis g. getula, a.k.a. the eastern kingsnake, a nonvenomous colubrid found in the eastern United States
 Pantherophis vulpinus, or the fox snakes, found in the open forests, prairies, and farmlands of western Michigan, Wisconsin, Minnesota, Illinois, and Iowa